The 2018 NPF College Draft was the 15th annual collegiate draft for the National Pro Fastpitch. It took place April 23, 2018 in Nashville, Tennessee at Acme Feed & Seed, a downtown entertainment venue. It was available for internet viewing via NPFTV, the league's streaming platform. The first selection was Paige Lowary of Oklahoma, picked by the Chicago Bandits.

The Draft

Drafting an athlete gives an NPF affiliate team the rights to that athlete for two full seasons.

Draft Selections 

Position key: 
C = catcher; INF = infielder; SS = shortstop; OF = outfielder; UT = Utility infielder; P = pitcher; RHP = right-handed pitcher; LHP = left-handed pitcher
Positions will be listed as combined for those who can play multiple positions.

Round 1

Round 2

Round 3

Round 4

Draft notes
Round 1:

Round 2:

Round 3:

Round 4:

Round 5:

Round 6:

References 

National Pro Fastpitch drafts
Softball in the United States
Softball teams
2018 in softball